Arizona School for the Arts is a non-profit public charter school in Phoenix, Arizona. Emphasis is placed on a college preparatory curriculum and the performing arts. Its mascot is a one-legged pigeon named Stumpy.

History
It was founded in 1995 by Mark S. Francis, with 155 students in grades 7–10. By 2002, it had grown to 280 students.
In 2005, it was honored as a Blue Ribbon school.

In 2008, it bought two buildings adjacent to its existing campus as demand for growth increased. This growth has allowed ASA to expand its enrollment by 80 high school students between 2007 and 2010.

In 2019, Phoenix mayor Kate Gallego proclaimed May 30 as Arizona School For The Arts Day.

Format
School begins at 7:45 AM. Students in grades 7-12 attend five academic classes in the morning and arts courses in the afternoon. Middle school students in 5-6 have two academic classes in the morning, two arts classes, then three academics in the afternoon. All students take math, English, science, and social studies; high school students take French or Spanish; and middle school students take piano, a class called Life Skills, and choir. Middle school students are allowed to pick one art (band, orchestra, dance, theatre, or guitar) in addition to piano and choir. High school students are allowed to pick both of their art courses and can pay to take a third after official school hours end (9th period: 3:25-4:25). Starting sophomore year, high school students can be selected to take AP classes to earn college credits. The school shuts its doors at 4:30 PM every day unless specifically noted.

Performances

Choral Collage 
Each winter, choir students in all grades perform a winter themed concert at Brophy College Preparatory or Camelback Bible Church. The concert takes place in December and usually begins at 7:30 PM. It usually ends at 9:30 PM. Specific students from band, orchestra, and dance are sometimes asked to provide accompaniment/dance entertainment during the pieces. There is usually an intermission halfway through the performance.

Showcase 
This is the school's biggest performance of the year. Every student participates and performs their art in some way. There are two performances and they are both different. It is a performance for family and friends to attend to see their hard-working students. It is performed at the Orpheum Theatre near the school. The rehearsals for the performance begin after the last day of academic classes, in late May. Students rehearse for two weeks until the performances which happen in late May or early June. The show is ran backstage by students in technical theater, and for singing acts, band or orchestra students play in the pit. The show sometimes has a plot behind it, but it is mostly a revue of sorts with an overall theme.

Notable alumni 

Matt Dallas - Actor, ABC Family TV show Kyle XY
David Hallberg – Ballet dancer
Alexandra Shipp – Actress
Taylor Upsahl - Singer/Songwriter
Kacy Hill - Singer/Songwriter

References

Public high schools in Arizona
Charter schools in Arizona
Public middle schools in Arizona
Schools of the performing arts in the United States
Schools in Phoenix, Arizona